Artillery Lake is a lake in the Northwest Territories, Canada on the Lockhart River about 20 miles east of Great Slave Lake. George Back reached it in 1834.

See also
List of lakes in the Northwest Territories

References

Lakes of the Northwest Territories